The Big Mac is a hamburger sold by the international fast food restaurant chain McDonald's. It was introduced in the Greater Pittsburgh area in 1967 and across the United States in 1968. It is one of the company's flagship products and signature dishes. The Big Mac contains two beef patties, cheese, shredded lettuce, pickles, minced onions, and a Thousand Island-type dressing advertised as "special sauce", on a three-slice sesame-seed bun.

History
The Big Mac was created by Jim Delligatti, who operated several McDonald's restaurants in the Pittsburgh area. It was created in the kitchen of Delligatti's first McDonald's franchise, located on McKnight Road in suburban Ross Township. 

It was designed to compete with Big Boy Restaurants' Big Boy hamburger. Eat'n Park was the Pittsburgh area's Big Boy franchisee at the time. The Big Mac proved popular and it was added to the menu of all U.S. McDonald's restaurants in 1968.

The Big Mac had two previous names, both of which failed in the marketplace: the Aristocrat and the Blue Ribbon Burger. The third name, Big Mac, was created by Esther Glickstein Rose, a 21-year-old advertising secretary who worked at McDonald's corporate headquarters in Oak Brook, Illinois.

Product
The Big Mac is made with two  beef patties, a "special sauce" (similar to Thousand Island dressing), shredded iceberg lettuce, one processed American cheese slice, two slices of dill pickle, and minced onions, served on a three slice sesame seed bun. On October 1, 2018, McDonald's announced that it would remove all artificial preservatives, flavors, and coloring from the Big Mac.

The Big Mac is known worldwide and is often used as a symbol of American capitalism and decadence. The Economist has used it as a reference point for comparing the cost of living in different countries – the Big Mac Index – as it is so widely available and is comparable across markets. This index is sometimes referred to as Burgernomics.

Sauce
Big Mac Sauce is delivered to McDonald's restaurants in sealed canisters designed by Sealright, from which it is meant to be directly dispensed using a calibrated "sauce gun" that dispenses a specified amount of the sauce for each pull of the trigger.

In 2012, McDonald's executive chef Dan Coudreaut released a YouTube video revealing the recipe of the sauce. It consists of store-bought mayonnaise, sweet pickle relish and yellow mustard whisked together with vinegar, garlic powder, onion powder and paprika.

In 2018, McDonald's revamped the sauce by removing potassium sorbate, sodium benzoate, and calcium disodium EDTA.

The sauce is occasionally available for purchase on its own for a limited time. The first time was in 2015. A  tube was available for purchase but only in restaurants in Australia.  The last time it was available was in 2020. A  pot was available for purchase but only in restaurants in the UK and Ireland.

Packaging
The Big Mac, along with many other McDonald's products, was first served in a collapsible cardboard container that was changed to a "clamshell" style, polystyrene foam  container in the late 1970s. Polystyrene foam containers were phased out beginning in 1990, due to environmental concerns.

Advertising

"Two all-beef patties" jingle

In 1974 McDonald's commissioned an advertising jingle which popularized the list of ingredients of the Big Mac: "Two all-beef patties, special sauce, lettuce, cheese, pickles, onions on a sesame seed bun."

In 2008, McDonald's restaurants in Malaysia revived the slogan. The revival included the original prize of a free Big Mac if the customer was able to recite the slogan in under four seconds. It was released in May, along with the promotional Mega Mac, which had four beef patties instead of two.

McDonaldland character

McDonalds began a television advertising campaign appealing to children in 1971 featuring a fantasy world populated by Ronald McDonald and various mascots promoting McDonalds products. Some characters were also modeled in McDonalds store playground equipment. The Big Mac was represented by Officer Big Mac, a Keystone Cops-style policeman with a giant Big Mac sandwich for a head. The characters were revised after a 1973 plagiarism lawsuit brought by television puppeteers Sid and Marty Krofft because of similarities to their H.R. Pufnstuf characters. A modified Officer Big Mac continued in the commercials until 1985.

Hip-hop product placement
In 2005, McDonald's began offering product placement rewards to hip hop artists who namechecked the Big Mac in their music, giving US$5 to the artist for every time a song mentioning the hamburger was played on the radio.

EU trademark revocation
McDonald's sued the Irish fast-food chain Supermac's for trademark infringement and claimed the name would confuse consumers in European markets. On 11 January 2019, the European Union Intellectual Property Office (EUIPO) ruled in Supermac's favor in what has been called a "David vs. Goliath" victory. McDonald's submitted a copy of the Wikipedia article about the Big Mac as part of its evidence, but the court found the Wikipedia page was not acceptable as "independent evidence".

In 2023, the EUIPO Board of Appeal annulled this decision after McDonald's filed 700 pages of additional evidence, despite objections.

US sales
In 2007, Danya Proud, a McDonald's spokeswoman, said that in the United States alone, 560 million Big Macs are sold each year. This means that approximately 17 Big Macs are sold every second.

Variants
 The Mega Mac or Double Big Mac: four  beef patties and an extra slice of cheese. Available in Canada, China, Egypt, Ireland, Japan, Malaysia, Taiwan (during promotional periods only), Turkey, Singapore, Pakistan, South Korea, Thailand, and United Kingdom. It was introduced to the United States in early 2020. In Australia it was discontinued and replaced by the Grand Big Mac. The Double Big Mac is the biggest regular hamburger the chain produces and it has 680 calories.
 Big Big Mac: a Quarter Pounder–like product sold in Europe (Finland, Belgium, Spain, Portugal, and Italy). Has been sold periodically in Sweden, there called "Grand Big Mac".
 The Denali Mac: made with two quarter pound patties. Named after Denali in Alaska, and sold only in that state.
 In India, where consuming beef is illegal in most states, the Big Mac is known as the Maharaja Mac and was originally made with lamb instead of beef; however, along with the company's other items, it is now made from chicken.
 The Chicken Big Mac is a Big Mac with two breaded chicken patties sold in Pakistan, Egypt, UAE, Kuwait, Qatar and other countries as a promotional burger.
 The Giga Big Mac, is sold in Japan. It is a larger version of the Big Mac with three times the meat of a regular one.
 Little Mac or Mac Jr. is a reduction of the standard Big Mac which uses a two-piece bun and contains only one beef patty. It has been available as a limited-time promotion in the U.S. since 2017.
 Grand Mac uses larger patties, at  combined. Available in the U.S. beginning in 2017 and was first made available overseas in the UK, Ireland, and Australia as the "Grand Big Mac" in 2018 to celebrate the 50th anniversary of the original Big Mac. This and the Mac Jr. were collectively known as the "Big Mac range" in the UK.
 Big Mac BLT is a standard Big Mac burger with the addition of bacon and tomato. Released in Australia and New Zealand as a promotional item in late 2017.
 Big Mac Bacon was introduced in selected markets in 2018, as a limited-time option. It is essentially a Big Mac with added bacon. In 2019, this was extended in the UK to the Grand Big Mac and the Mac Jr.

Museum

On August 22, 2007, McDonald's opened the Big Mac Museum in North Huntingdon, Pennsylvania to celebrate the Big Mac's 40th anniversary. The museum features the world's largest Big Mac statue (measuring 14 feet high and 12 feet wide) and has hundreds of historical artifacts and exhibits that celebrate the Big Mac.

Some Uniontown residents were unhappy with the selected location.

Nutritional values per geographical location
The Big Mac is a geographically localized product. In the United States, the Big Mac has 550 kcal (2,300 kJ), 29 grams of fat and 25 grams of protein. In Australasia, the burger is slightly smaller with 493 kcal (2,060 kJ) and 26.9 grams of fat, but similar amounts of protein with 25.2 grams, while the Japanese burger tops out the scales at 557 kcal and 30.5 grams of fat. Several McDonald's subsidiaries adapt the standard features of the Big Mac (from the USA) to regional requirements.

Gallery

See also

 Don Gorske, a Big Mac enthusiast
 The Big Mac Index, a price index published by The Economist
 List of sandwiches

Similar products by other restaurant chains:
 Big Boy (Big Boy Restaurants and Frisch's Big Boy)
 Big Hardee (Hardee's)
 Big King (Burger King)
 Big Jack (Hungry Jack's), subject of an ongoing trademark infringement lawsuit filed by McDonalds.
 Big Shef (Burger Chef)
 Big Wink (Winky's)
 Bonus Jack (Jack in the Box)
 Double-double Animal Style (In-N-Out Burger)
 Superburger (Eat'n Park)
 Teen Burger (A&W) is not a double decker like the Big Mac, but its "teen sauce" is similar to Big Mac sauce.
 Whopper, Burger King's signature sandwich

References

Further reading

External links

 Official US product information
 Official UK product information
 Official product information for the Chicken Maharaja-Mac
 The Big Mac Index
 The Big Mac Museum in North Huntingdon, Pennsylvania
 Photo Tour of Big Mac Museum

Fast food hamburgers
History of Pittsburgh
McDonald's foods
Products introduced in 1967